Balwantrao Nageshrao Datar, known as B. N. Datar (13 August 1894 – 13 February 1963) was an Indian educationist, politician and Union government minister.

Early life and education 
Datar was educated at  Deccan College, Baroda College (now the Maharaja Sayajirao University of Baroda) and the Government Law College, Mumbai, from which he qualified as a lawyer. From 1937 to 1942, he was a member of the Senate of the University of Bombay and a member of its Board of Studies in Kannada. He served on the academic council of Karnatak University from 1950 to 1952.

Political career 
In 1952, he was elected to the 1st Lok Sabha as a member of the Indian National Congress from the constituency of Belgaum North, holding this seat until the 1957 general election, when he was elected to the newly created seat of Belgaum. From August 1952 to February 1956, Datar was a deputy home minister in the Union government, with cabinet rank from February 1956 to April 1957. He then served as Minister of State for Home affairs until his death in office in February 1963.

References

|-

1894 births
1963 deaths
Indian National Congress politicians from Karnataka
Lok Sabha members from Karnataka
India MPs 1952–1957
India MPs 1957–1962
India MPs 1962–1967
Government ministers of India